West Chester Downtown Historic District is a national historic district located in West Chester, Chester County, Pennsylvania. It encompasses 3,137 contributing buildings in West Chester. It includes residential, commercial, institutional, and industrial  buildings built between 1789 and the 1930s. Notable buildings include the U.S. Post Office, Green Tree Building (1933), St. Agnes Church (1851), Biddle Street School (1917), Major Groff Memorial Armory, Horticulture Building (1848) designed by Thomas U. Walter, Denney-Reyburn factory, Caleb Taylor Store (c. 1818), Federal Ehne's Bakery (c. 1816), Kofke's Store (c. 1816), and Woolworth (1928). Also listed and located in the district are the Bank of Chester County, Buckwalter Building, Chester County Courthouse, Farmers and Mechanics Building, and Warner Theater.

It was listed on the National Register of Historic Places in 1985. The boundary was increased on February 27, 2005.

References

External links

 Chester County Horticultural Hall, 225 North High Street, West Chester, Chester County, PA: 8 photos and 13 data pages at Historic American Buildings Survey
 Chester County Hotel, 36 West Market Street, West Chester, Chester County, PA: 4 photos, 5 data pages, and 1 photo caption page at Historic American Buildings Survey
 Chester County Prison, 235 West Market Street, West Chester, Chester County, PA: 19 photos and 19 data pages at Historic American Buildings Survey
 Baptist Church of West Chester, 221 South High Street, West Chester, Chester County, PA: 2 photos, 11 data pages, and 1 photo caption page at Historic American Buildings Survey

West Chester, Pennsylvania
Historic districts on the National Register of Historic Places in Pennsylvania
Historic districts in Chester County, Pennsylvania
National Register of Historic Places in Chester County, Pennsylvania